Events in the year 2018 in Iran.

Incumbents
 Supreme Leader of Iran: Ali Khamenei
 President of Iran: Hassan Rouhani 
 Parliament of Iran: Ali Larijani
 Judiciary System of Iran: Sadeq Larijani

Events

January
 January 1 – As protests continue from last year, ten people are killed in the streets overnight.
 January 4 – The United States treasury sanctions five entities associated with Iran's ballistic missiles program.
 January 6 – Thousands of pro-government demonstrators march the streets for the fourth day in a row.
 January 7 – A ban is enforced on teaching the English language in primary schools blaming that on the unrest.
 January 30 – Mehdi Karroubi accuses Khamenei of abuse of power.

February
 18 – Iran Aseman Airlines Flight 3704

May
 May 6 – concern over United States President Donald Trump Iran nuclear deal over sanction that will keeping international oil market on edge, ongoing Venezuela economic crisis, analysts warned that threaten to further crimp production and export. price rose $70 barrel up higher since November 2014.
May 9 – Iranian Parliament burned America flag called 'death to america' anger over after President Trump United States withdrawal from the Joint Comprehensive Plan of Action.

September
 18 September – 21 people are killed and 25 others are injured in a collision between a passenger bus and a trailer carrying flammable materials in Isfahan.

November 
 November 12  Sarpol-e Zahab in Kermanshah province, eastern Iran was hit by an earthquake of 6.3 magnitude, injuring about 700 people.
 November -United Nations’ General Assembly’s Human Rights Committee approved a resolution against Iranian government’s continuous discrimination against women and limitation of freedom of thought.
 November – A group of UN human rights experts including Javid Rehman U.N. Special rapporteur on the situation of human rights in Iran and four others experts concern about Farhad Meysami’s situation who has been on hunger strike since August. He is in jail for opposing compulsory hijab.

December 
 December 1 – Amnesty International asked the government of Iran to bring to light what has happened to the political detainees in the country. Amnesty asked United nations to set up an investigation group to find the facts of crimes against humanity in Iran
 On 27 December 2018 Security forces attacked with tear gas a teachers gathering outside the education office in Isfahan, central Iran. Teachers were protesting their low salary and the arrest of their colleagues who are now in jail.

Deaths

2 January – Ali Akbar Moinfar, politician (born 1928).
9 January – Reza Sheikholeslami, academic (born 1941)
17 January – Jahangir Amuzegar, economist, academic and politician (born 1920)
9 March – Ali Asghar Khodadoust, eye surgeon (born 1935)
22 March – Dariush Shayegan, philosopher and cultural theorist (born 1935)
4 May – Naser Cheshmazar, composer (born 1950)
25 May – Naser Malek Motiei, actor (born 1930)
17 August – Ezzatolah Entezami, actor (born 1924)

References

 
2010s in Iran
Years of the 21st century in Iran
Iran
Iran